Durgadutta Chunnilal Sagarmal Khandelwal  Post Graduate College or Simply DCSK is an educational institution in Mau of Uttar Pradesh state in India.

Departments 
The departments offering courses include:

Physics
Chemistry
Mathematics
Zoology
Botany
Journalism and Mass Communicating
Economics
Political Science
History
Geography
Sociology
Psychology
Education
English
Hindi
Urdu
Sanskrit

See also
 List of universities in India
 Universities and colleges in India
 Education in India
 Distance Education Council
 University Grants Commission (India)

References

External links 
 

Postgraduate colleges in Uttar Pradesh
Mau
Educational institutions established in 1964
1964 establishments in Uttar Pradesh